is a 1988 Japanese romantic drama film directed by Shusuke Kaneko, based on the manga series The Heart of Thomas by Moto Hagio. It follows the lives of four students at a remote all-boys boarding school after one of their classmates commits suicide. Although the manga concerns homoerotic relationships among the boys, director Kaneko used girls, aged 14 to 16, to portray the boys in the film.

Cast
 Eri Miyajima as Yu / Kaoru
 Minami Takayama as the voice of Yu / Kaoru
  as Kazuhiko
 Nozomu Sasaki as the voice of Kazuhiko
  as Naoto
 Hiromi Murata as the voice of Naoto
 Eri Fukatsu as Norio
  as Narrator

Release
Summer Vacation 1999 was released theatrically in Japan by Shochiku on March 26, 1988. It was shown as part of the New Directors/New Films Festival at the Museum of Modern Art in New York City in March 1989. The film was also later screened at the 2001 Dutch Transgender Film Festival (NTGF). In March 2014, Summer Vacation 1999 was part of the program honoring film critic Donald Richie at the Japan Society of New York.

Reception
At the 10th Yokohama Film Festival in 1989, the film was ranked number 8 in the Best 10 Films of the year. At the same festival, director Shusuke Kaneko won the Best Director award for his work on this film and his other 1988 entry Last Cabaret, and Kenji Takama won the award for Best Cinematography. The film was also nominated for the Best Editing Award at the 12th Japan Academy Film Prizes.

References

External links
 

1988 films
1988 romantic drama films
1988 LGBT-related films
1980s Japanese films
Films directed by Shusuke Kaneko
Films featuring an all-female cast
Films about sexual repression
Films set in 1999
Japanese coming-of-age films
Japanese LGBT-related films
Gay-related films
Japanese romantic drama films
Live-action films based on manga
Shochiku films